1952 in sports describes the year's events in world sport.

American football
 NFL Championship: the Detroit Lions won 17–7 over the Cleveland Browns at Cleveland Stadium
 Sugar Bowl (1951 season):
 The Tennessee Volunteers lose 28–13 to the Maryland Terrapins; still awarded the national championship by the AP and Coaches Poll
 1952 college football season:
 The Michigan State Spartans win the college football national championship (don't play in a bowl game the following January)

Association football
England
 First Division – Manchester United win the 1951–52 title.
 FA Cup – Newcastle United beat Arsenal 1–0.
Spain
 La Liga won by Barcelona.
Italy
 Serie A won by  Juventus.
Germany
 German football championship won by VfB Stuttgart.
France
 French Division 1 won by OGC Nice.
Portugal
 Primeira Liga won by Sporting C.P.

Australian rules football
Victorian Football League
 June 14: In an effort to promote the code outside its traditional strongholds in the southern and western states, the League holds a “National Day Round” of matches in selected interstate and country venues: Albury, Euroa, Yallourn, Sydney, Brisbane and Hobart. Despite flooding rains, attendances were high enough to deem the venture a success though it was never repeated.
 Geelong wins the 56th VFL Premiership by defeating Collingwood 13.8 (86) to 5.10 (40) in the 1952 VFL Grand Final
 Brownlow Medal awarded to Roy Wright (Richmond) and Bill Hutchison (Essendon)
South Australian National Football League
 October 4: North Adelaide beat Norwood 23.15 (153) to 6.9 (45) in the most one-sided SANFL Grand Final until 2004.
 Magarey Medal awarded to Len Fitzgerald (Sturt)
Western Australian National Football League
 October 11:  win their sixth premiership beating  12.19 (91) to 10.10 (70)
 Sandover Medal awarded to Steve Marsh (South Fremantle)

Baseball
 January 31 – The Hall of Fame elects two new members – Harry Heilmann, with 203 votes, and Paul Waner with 195. Waner, a .333 career hitter, rapped out 3,152 hits and struck out just 376 times in 9,459 career at–bats. Heilmann was similarly skilled with the bat, winning four batting titles with the Tigers and finishing his career with a .342 average
 World Series – New York Yankees win 4 games to 3 over the Brooklyn Dodgers

Basketball
 NCAA Men's Basketball Championship –
 Kansas wins 80–63 over St. John's
NBA Finals 
Minneapolis Lakers win four games to three over the New York Knicks
Spain
 Saski Baskonia was founded in Vitoria Gasteiz on December 3.

Boxing
 June 25 at Yankee Stadium, Joey Maxim defeats Sugar Ray Robinson by knockout to retain his world light heavyweight title. This is the only knockout Robinson would ever suffer.
 August 11 – death in a road accident of Dave Sands (26), Australian Aborigine middleweight rated third in the world at the time
 September 23 at Philadelphia, Rocky Marciano knocked out Jersey Joe Walcott in the 13th round to win the World Heavyweight Championship.

Canadian football
 Grey Cup – Toronto Argonauts win 21–11 over the Edmonton Eskimos

Cricket
Events
 16 October–18 October, Delhi – Pakistan plays its first Test match, against India. India won by an innings and 70 runs.
England
 County Championship – Surrey
 Minor Counties Championship – Buckinghamshire
 Most runs – Len Hutton 2567 @ 61.11 (HS 189)
 Most wickets – Johnny Wardle 172 @ 19.27 (BB 7–49)
 Wisden Cricketers of the Year – Fred Trueman, Harold Gimblett, Tom Graveney, David Sheppard, Stuart Surridge
 India make a fourth tour of England, and lose the four-Test series three games to nil
Australia
 Sheffield Shield – New South Wales
 Most runs – Lindsay Hassett 855 @ 61.07 (HS 229)
 Most wickets – Bill Johnston 54 @ 20.62 (BB 7–114)
 The West Indies make a second tour of Australia, losing as in the first four Tests to one
India
 Ranji Trophy – Bombay
 England make a second tour of India, drawing the five-test series with one victory each and three draws
New Zealand
 Plunket Shield – Canterbury
South Africa
 Currie Cup – Transvaal

Cycling
 Giro d'Italia won by Fausto Coppi of Italy
 Tour de France – Fausto Coppi of Italy
 UCI Road World Championships – Men's road race – Heinz Müller of Germany

Field hockey
 Olympic Games (Men's Competition) in Helsinki, Finland
 Gold Medal: India
 Silver Medal: The Netherlands
 Bronze Medal: Great Britain

Figure skating
 World Figure Skating Championships –
 Men's champion: Dick Button, United States
 Ladies’ champion: Jacqueline du Bief, France
 Pair skating champions: Ria Falk & Paul Falk, Germany
 Ice dancing champions: Jean Westwood & Lawrence Demmy, Great Britain
 In this year, ice dancing introduced as part of the World Figure Skating Championships.
 American defending champion Dick Button becomes first figure-skater to land a triple jump in competition; performs a triple loop in the Olympic free skate in Oslo

Golf
Men's professional
 Masters Tournament – Sam Snead
 U.S. Open – Julius Boros
 PGA Championship – Jim Turnesa
 British Open – Bobby Locke
 PGA Tour money leader – Julius Boros – $37,033
Men's amateur
 British Amateur – Harvie Ward
 U.S. Amateur – Jack Westland
Women's professional
 Women's Western Open – Betsy Rawls
 U.S. Women's Open – Louise Suggs
 Titleholders Championship – Babe Zaharias
 LPGA Tour money leader – Betsy Rawls  – $14,505

Harness racing
 Little Brown Jug for pacers won by Meadow Rice
 Hambletonian for trotters won by Sharp Note
 Australian Inter Dominion Harness Racing Championship –
 Pacers: Avian Derby

Horse racing
Steeplechases
 Cheltenham Gold Cup – Mont Tremblant
 Grand National – Teal
Hurdle races
 Champion Hurdle – Sir Ken
Flat races
 Australia – Melbourne Cup won by Dalray
 Canada – Queen's Plate won by Epigram
 France – Prix de l'Arc de Triomphe won by Nuccio
 Ireland – Irish Derby Stakes won by Thirteen of Diamonds
 English Triple Crown Races:
 2000 Guineas Stakes – Thunderhead
 The Derby – Tulyar
 St. Leger Stakes – Tulyar
 United States Triple Crown Races:
 Kentucky Derby – Hill Gail
 Preakness Stakes – Blue Man
 Belmont Stakes – One Count

Ice hockey
 World Hockey Championship
 Men's champion: Canada defeated the United States
 Stanley Cup – Detroit Red Wings win 4 games to 0 over the Montreal Canadiens
 Art Ross Trophy as the NHL's leading scorer during the regular season: Gordie Howe, Detroit Red Wings
 Hart Memorial Trophy – for the NHL's Most Valuable Player: Gordie Howe, Detroit Red Wings
 NCAA Men's Ice Hockey Championship – Michigan Wolverines defeat Colorado College Tigers 4–1 in Colorado Springs, Colorado
 November 1 – Hockey Night in Canada makes its television debut on CBC. It is the oldest sports-related TV program still airing.

Motorsport

Professional wrestling
 WWE is founded by Roderick James "Jess" McMahon and Joseph Raymond "Toots" Mondt.

Rugby league
1952–53 European Rugby League Championship / 1951–52 European Rugby League Championship
1952 New Zealand rugby league season
1952 NSWRFL season
1952–53 Northern Rugby Football League season / 1951–52 Northern Rugby Football League season

Rugby union
 58th Five Nations Championship series is won by Wales who complete the Grand Slam

Skiing
 Alpine skiing
 Men's Olympic gold medals:
 Downhill: Zeno Colò, Italy
 Slalom: Othmar Schneider, Austria
 Giant Slalom: Stein Eriksen, Norway
 Women's Olympic gold medals:
 Downhill: Trude Jochum-Beiser, Austria
 Slalom: Andrea Mead Lawrence, United States
 Giant Slalom: Andrea Mead Lawrence, United States

Snooker
 Schism in snooker means two world championships are held:
 World Snooker Championship (World Professional Match-play Championship): Fred Davis beats Walter Donaldson 38–35
 World Snooker Championship (BACC event): Horace Lindrum beats Clark McConachy 94–49

Speed skating
Speed Skating World Championships
 Men's All-round Champion – Hjalmar Andersen (Norway)

Tennis
Australia
 Australian Men's Singles Championship – Ken McGregor (Australia) defeats Frank Sedgman (Australia) 7–5, 12–10, 2–6, 6–2
 Australian Women's Singles Championship – Thelma Coyne Long (Australia) defeats Helen Angwin (Australia) 6–2, 6–3
England
 Wimbledon Men's Singles Championship – Frank Sedgman (Australia) defeats Jaroslav Drobný (Egypt) 4–6, 6–2, 6–3, 6–2
 Wimbledon Women's Singles Championship – Maureen Connolly Brinker (USA) defeats Louise Brough Clapp (USA) 6–4, 6–3
France
 French Men's Singles Championship – Jaroslav Drobný (Egypt) defeats Frank Sedgman (Australia) 6–2, 6–0, 3–6, 6–4
 French Women's Singles Championship – Doris Hart (USA) defeats Shirley Fry Irvin (USA) 6–4, 6–4
USA
 American Men's Singles Championship –	Frank Sedgman (Australia) defeats Gardnar Mulloy (USA) 6–1, 6–2, 6–3
 American Women's Singles Championship – Maureen Connolly (USA) defeats Doris Hart (USA) 6–3, 7–5
Davis Cup
 1952 Davis Cup –  4–1  at Memorial Drive Tennis Centre (grass) Adelaide, Australia

Volleyball
 Men's World Championship in Moscow, Soviet Union
 Gold Medal: Soviet Union
 Silver Medal: Czechoslovakia
 Bronze Medal: Bulgaria

Olympic Games
 1952 Summer Olympics takes place in Helsinki, Finland
 United States wins the most medals (76), and the most gold medals (40).
 Emil Zátopek wins marathon.
 1952 Winter Olympics takes place in Oslo, Norway
 Norway wins the most medals (16), and the most gold medals (7).

Awards
 Associated Press Male Athlete of the Year – Bob Mathias, Track and field
 Associated Press Female Athlete of the Year – Maureen Connolly, Tennis

Notes
Awarded retrospectively by the VFL in 1989.

References

 
Sports by year